Becky is a 2020 American action thriller film directed by Jonathan Milott and Cary Murnion, from a screenplay by Nick Morris, Lane Skye, and Ruckus Skye. The film stars Lulu Wilson, Kevin James, and Joel McHale.

Becky was scheduled to have its world premiere at the Tribeca Film Festival in April 2020, but the festival was postponed due to the COVID-19 pandemic. It was released on video-on-demand, digital platforms and in select drive-in theaters on June 5, 2020, by Quiver Distribution and Redbox Entertainment. The film received mixed reviews from critics, though many praised Wilson's performance. A sequel, The Wrath of Becky, had its world premiere at South by Southwest (SXSW) on March 10, 2023.

Plot
A law enforcement officer and a civilian, possibly a psychologist, are trying to interview thirteen-year-old Becky Hopper regarding an event that recently took place at her family's house. Even though the audience sees her having flashbacks of the event, Becky only gives vague answers and pretends not to remember anything apart from some insignificant minor details.

Two weeks earlier, Becky was a bullied high school student whose mother died a year earlier. She has a strained relationship with her father Jeff, who attempts to reconnect with her with a trip to their lakefront home. Meanwhile, prisoner Dominick Lewis, a Neo-Nazi, and his men Wallace "Apex" Landham, Sonny Cole, and Roman Hammond are being transferred in a prison van. Dominick has an inmate killed to get the guards to pull over, using the opportunity to kill them and pose as policemen. They stop a man and his two children on the street and take their car, killing the man and apparently the children.

Jeff's girlfriend Kayla and her young son Ty arrive at the house, upsetting Becky. Jeff announces that he and Kayla are engaged. Hurt, Becky runs out of the house, followed by her beloved dog, Diego (a Cane Corso). At her small fort in the woods, she retrieves a large key, the bow of which is formed in the shape of a valknut symbol. Dominick and his men show up at the house, take everyone hostage, and demand the key. Kayla and Ty try to escape but are caught by Apex, who tries to help them while Cole kills Dora, the family's other dog. Jeff lies about Becky's presence to protect her, but Dominick catches on and shoots Kayla in the leg to get the truth out of them.

Becky, still in the woods, becomes aware of the intruders' presence and talks over a walkie-talkie, lying about calling the police. Dominick calls her bluff and brings Jeff outside to the family's firepit to lure Becky out. He begins to torture Jeff with a hot metal rod. Becky relents and says she will give him the key. Dominick allows her father to talk through the talkie, but Jeff tells Becky to run. Jeff breaks free and finds Becky, telling her he loves her before Dominick shoots him dead. Dominick demands the key and Becky gouges out his left eye with it before fleeing with Diego.

Dominick goes back into the house to cut off the dangling eye and sends Cole and Hammond out to retrieve the key. Cole finds and chases Becky back to her fort. Cole tries to negotiate with Becky, but she surprises him and stabs him repeatedly with colored pencils and jabs a sharp ruler through his neck, killing him.

Apex shows Kayla and Ty compassion and Dominick tries to have Apex reaffirm his loyalty to him. After finding Cole's corpse, Hammond chases Becky down to the lake, where she makes him trip and land on a wooden plank of nails. Hammond falls in the lake and Becky uses a nearby boat motor to shred Hammond's chest. She is found by Apex, who momentarily incapacitates Diego. Not wanting to hurt Becky, Apex urges her to flee.

Becky makes her presence known to Kayla and Ty; Kayla tries to distract Dominick by asking him about the key's purpose. Becky sets off the car alarm to lure Dominick out as Kayla tries to free herself. Apex fends off Dominick long enough for Becky to use a lawnmower to run over Dominick's head. Becky then shoots Apex in the head. Kayla and Ty come out with Diego and sit beside Becky as they wait for the police. In the present, Becky claims she does not remember the gang's deaths, with a cold look on her face, one hand nonchalantly playing with the key dangling from a ribbon around her neck.

Cast

Production
In May 2019, it was announced Simon Pegg and Lulu Wilson had joined the cast of the film, with Jonathan Milott and Cary Murnion directing from a screenplay by Nick Morris, Lane Skye and Ruckus Skye. In July 2019, it was announced Kevin James had joined the cast of the film, replacing Pegg who dropped out due to a scheduling conflict. In August 2019, Joel McHale, Amanda Brugel and Robert Maillet joined the cast of the film.

Release
The film was scheduled to have its world premiere at the Tribeca Film Festival on April 20, 2020. However, the festival was postponed due to the COVID-19 pandemic. That same month, Quiver Distribution and Redbox Entertainment acquired distribution rights to the film and set it for a June 5, 2020, release.

Through its first 10 days of release, the film ranked as high as 8th on Spectrum's rental charts and 12th at the iTunes Store.

Reception

Box office
Becky made $205,797 from 45 theaters in its opening weekend, finishing second among reported films. It made $192,138 from 50 theaters in its second weekend, becoming the first film to officially top The Wretched at the box office. It made $85,056 the following week but was itself dethroned by newcomer Followed, before returning to first in its fourth weekend.

Critical response
The website's critics consensus reads: "Becky isn't quite able to sustain enough intensity to fully take advantage of its premise, though it serves up entertainingly nasty thrills for genre fans." On Metacritic, the film has a weighted average score of 54 out of 100, based on 22 critics, indicating "mixed or average reviews".

Dennis Harvey of Variety called the film an "over-the-top yet effectively taut thriller" and "Wilson's nimble half-brat, half-she-devil performance is key to our buying the basic premise, aided by solid supporting cast contributions. James grows less intimidating the more dialogue he's given in an otherwise trim script by marital duo Ruckus and Lane Skye." Jordan Mintzer of The Hollywood Reporter wrote: "Becky tends to work best when it revels in the blood-splattered set pieces of its script (written by Ruckus Skye, Lane Skye and Nick Morris), going that extra mile and a half in the gore department (special effects makeup was by Karlee Morse) to create some truly disgusting moments, albeit ones that are laced with a grim sense of humor."

Sequel
A sequel, The Wrath of Becky, had its world premiere at South by Southwest (SXSW) on March 10, 2023.

References

External links
 

2020 films
2020 action thriller films
2020s English-language films
American action thriller films
Films about neo-Nazis
Films about vacationing
Home invasions in film
Quiver Distribution films
Films directed by Jonathan Milott and Cary Murnion
2020s American films